The Richard J. Oglesby statue is a monumental statue of Richard J. Oglesby in Chicago, Illinois, United States. Dedicated in 1919, the statue was designed by Leonard Crunelle and located in the city's Lincoln Park.

History 
Richard J. Oglesby was an American politician and military commander who served in the Union Army during the American Civil War and served multiple terms as Governor of Illinois, and then as a U.S. Senator in the late 1800s. He died in 1899. By December 1916, sculptor Leonard Crunelle was chosen to design a monument honoring him at a cost of $25,000, approved by the Illinois General Assembly. The monument, featuring a bronze sculpture of Oglesby atop a granite pedestal, was dedicated in 1919 in Lincoln Park. In November 1991, the statue was highlighted in an article of the Chicago Tribune that discussed the neglected state of public art in Chicago and interviewed Andrzej Dajnowski, the first sculpture conservator for the Chicago Park District, who talked about repairs that would happen to the sculpture.

See also 

 1919 in art

References

External links 
 
 

1919 establishments in Illinois
1919 sculptures
Bronze sculptures in Illinois
Monuments and memorials in Chicago
Outdoor sculptures in Chicago
Sculptures of men in Illinois
Statues in Chicago
Union (American Civil War) monuments and memorials in Illinois
Vandalized works of art in Illinois